Juan Gabriel (1950–2016) was a Mexican singer and songwriter.

Juan Gabriel may also refer to:

Juan Gabriel (album), the 29th studio album by Juan Gabriel

People
Juan Gabriel Concepción (b. 1972), Spanish pole vaulter
Juan Gabriel Maldonado (b. 1990), Paraguayan footballer
Juan Gabriel Pareja (b. 1978), American actor
Juan Gabriel Patiño (b. 1989), Paraguayan footballer
Juan Gabriel Rivas (b. 1992), Argentine footballer
Juan Gabriel Uribe Vegalara, Colombian politician and journalist
Juan Gabriel Valdés (b. 1947), Chilean political scientist
Juan Gabriel Vásquez (b. 1973), Colombian writer